In a referendum on 21 May 2006, the people of Montenegro opted to leave the State Union of Serbia and Montenegro. This result was confirmed with a declaration of independence by the Montenegrin parliament on 3 June 2006. It simultaneously requested international recognition and outlined foreign policy goals.

As enumerated in the parliamentary declaration of 3 June 2006, Montenegro's near-term primary foreign policy objectives are integration into the European Union, membership in the United Nations, to which it was admitted on 28 June 2006 and in NATO (which it joined as of 2017).

Russia gave official recognition on 11 June 2006, and was the first permanent member of the United Nations Security Council to do so. The European Council of Ministers recognized Montenegrin independence on 12 June, as did the United States. The United Kingdom extended recognition on 13 June. The last two permanent members of the United Nations Security Council, France and the People's Republic of China recognised the government of Montenegro on 14 June.

On 30 November 2006, the Government adopted the Memorandum of Agreement between Montenegro and the Republic of Serbia on Consular Protection and Services to the Citizens of Montenegro. By this agreement, Serbia, through its network of diplomatic and consular missions, provides consular services to the Montenegrin citizens on the territory of states in which Montenegro has no missions of its own. In October 2008, Montenegro recognized Kosovo.

Membership in international organizations 

 On June 28, 2006, Montenegro was added to the American Radio Relay League's DXCC List as the 336th entry based on membership in the UN. 
 Montenegro acceded to the Geneva Conventions on August 2, 2006.
 382 is Montenegro's telephone country code  
 .me is an Internet country code top-level domain (ccTLD) that was assigned to Montenegro, following the decision on 26 September 2006 by the ISO 3166 Maintenance Agency to allocate ME as the ISO 3166-1 alpha-2 code for Montenegro.

Diplomatic relations

Montenegro does not maintain diplomatic relations with the following 11 UN member states:

Bhutan
Cameroon
Equatorial Guinea
Madagascar
Marshall Islands
Nigeria 
Papua New Guinea
São Tomé and Príncipe 
Somalia 
Tanzania  
Tonga

Montenegro-Canada relations
Canadian Foreign Minister Peter MacKay wrote to Foreign Minister Miodrag Vlahović extending diplomatic recognition and agreeing to hold discussions on the establishment of diplomatic relations, which occurred later in 2007.

The Canadian Embassy in Belgrade is accredited to Montenegro. There is currently no resident Montenegrin mission in Ottawa, so its ambassador in Washington, DC is accredited to Canada. However, Montenegro has Honorary Consuls in Toronto and Vancouver.

Montenegro-China relations

The establishment of diplomatic relations between the People's Republic of China and the Republic of Montenegro was confirmed on 14 June 2006.

China transformed its consulate into an embassy in Podgorica on July 7, 2006. The Montenegrin embassy in China opened in Beijing on November 13, 2007.

In 2015, total trade between the two countries amounted to 160,385,964 euros.

Montenegro-United States of America relations

The United States recognized the Republic of Montenegro on June 12, 2006, being among the first states to do so. Diplomatic relations between the two countries were established on August 15, and have since rapidly developed. On August 28, six U.S. Senators, John McCain (R-AZ), Saxby Chambliss (R-GA), Mel Martinez (R-FL), Lindsey Graham (R-SC), Richard Burr (R-NC) and John E. Sununu (R-NH), made an official visit to Montenegro. Their activities included a meeting with President Vujanović and with the speaker of the Montenegrin parliament.

Soon after the congressional visit, Defense Secretary Donald Rumsfeld paid an official visit to Montenegro, seeking support for the War on Terror and overall American geopolitical goals in Europe. Following the Secretary's meeting with Montenegrin Prime Minister Milo Đukanović, it was announced that Montenegro had agreed in principle to aid the US efforts in Iraq and Afghanistan, although no specific pledges of aid were made. For his part, Secretary Rumsfeld stated that the United States supported Montenegro's desire to join NATO and would also assist in its acquiring membership in the Partnership for Peace programme.

Bilateral relations turned a new page on October 5 when the United States opened an embassy in Podgorica at a ceremony attended by Deputy Assistant Secretary of State Rosemary DiCarlo, Montenegrin Foreign Minister Miodrag Vlahović, Mayor Miomir Mugoša and US Charge d'affaires Arlene Ferrill. Roderick W. Moore, the first-ever Ambassador of the United States of America to the Republic of Montenegro, presented his credentials to Montenegrin President Vujanović on September 19, 2007.

Montenegro currently maintains an embassy in Washington, D.C. and a consulate in New York City.

See also
 Montenegro Albania border
 Foreign relations of Serbia and Montenegro
 List of Ambassadors from Montenegro
 List of Ambassadors to Montenegro
 List of diplomatic missions in Montenegro
 List of diplomatic missions of Montenegro
 Montenegro in intergovernmental organizations
 Foreign relations of Yugoslavia

References

External links
 Ministry of Foreign Affairs of Montenegro 
 Embassies and consulates in and of Montenegro
 Embassy of the United States of America in Podgorica
 The Njegoskij Fund Network: Foreign Representations in Montenegro
 The Njegoskij Fund Network: Montenegrin Representations Abroad
 The Njegoskij Fund Network: Today's Montenegro: Diplomacy

 
Politics of Montenegro
Government of Montenegro